Carool Kersten (Haelen, 28 June 1964) is a Dutch scholar of Islam and the author and editor of eleven books. Trained as an Arabist, Southeast Asianist and scholar of Religions, he currently is Professor of Islamic Studies  at the Catholic University Leuven in Belgium and Emeritus Reader in the Study of Islam & the Muslim World at King's College London. His research interests focus on the modern and contemporary Muslim world, in particular political and intellectual developments in both regional and global contexts.

Education

Carool Kersten studied Arabic and Middle Eastern Studies at the then still existing Institute for Languages and Cultures of the Middle East at Radboud University Nijmegen in the Netherlands. He specialized in modern Middle Eastern and Islamic Studies, with minors in International Law, International Relations and Indonesian. In 1987, he was awarded the academic title of doctorandus (equivalent of an MA) in Arabic Language and Culture with distinction, on the basis of a dissertation on the theory and practice of the Islamic law of treaties. After graduation he went to Egypt, where he attended the International Language Institute in Cairo. In 1988, he was admitted as a Sworn Translator by the Netherlands District Court in Arnhem. He returned to Nijmegen during a sabbatical (1995-1996) to do graduate work in philosophy. Taking another sabbatical year in 2001, he studied at Payap University in Chiang Mai, Thailand, where he obtained a Certificate in Thai and Southeast Asian Studies. In 2005, he moved to England in order to conduct postgraduate research at the School of Oriental and African Studies (SOAS) and was awarded a PhD in the Study of Religions in 2009. In his thesis, written under the supervision of Professor Christopher Shackle and entitled 'Occupants of the Third Space: New Muslim Intellectuals and the Study of Islam', he dealt with the work of three contemporary Muslim scholars, (Nurcholish Madjid, Hasan Hanafi, Mohammed Arkoun). It has since been published as Cosmopolitans and Heretics by Hurst and Oxford University Press

Career
Except for a sabbatical year (1995–96), from 1988 until 2003, Carool Kersten worked for the Dutch construction and engineering company Ballast Nedam Group. In 1989 he was transferred to Saudi Arabia to provide support for the company's operations in the Middle East, where he held a number of staff and project positions, including that of personnel and general services manager for the company's Middle East operations (1996–2000). After leaving Saudi Arabia in late 2000, he was retained as a consultant and translator until 2003. From 2002 until 2007, Kersten taught Asian history and religions at the Center for International and Graduate Studies (now known as the Institute of South East Asian Studies, SEAIGS) of Payap University in Chiang Mai, Thailand. Subsequently, he held appointments in the Department of Theology & Religious Studies and the Institute of Middle Eastern Studies at King's College London (2007-2022) as Lecturer, Senior Lecturer and Reader (Associate Professor) in the Study of Islam & the Muslim World. In July 2022, he was appointed Research Professor (BOFZAP) in Islamic Studies at the Faculty of Theology & Religious Studies of the Catholic University of Leuven (KULeuven). In recognition and appreciation of his services to the university and to his academic field,  effective 2 July 2022, King's College London conferred on him the title of "Emeritus Reader in the Study of Islam and the Muslim world".

Other activities
Carool Kersten is founding editor of the book series Contemporary Thought in the Islamic World, published by Routledge since 2011, and a Fellow of the Higher Education Academy (HEA). He also is a founding member of the British Association for Islamic Studies . Serving as a BRAIS Council Member from 2014 to 2020, he continues to sit on its advisory board. In October 2014, he was elected a Research Associate of the Institute of Philosophical Studies at the Science & Research Centre Koper in Slovenia, and elevated to Senior Research Associate in November 2020. In that same year he also joined the Scholarly Network for Philosophy in the Modern Islamic World, hosted by the Free University Berlin. Kersten makes regular media appearances as an analyst and commentator on developments in the Muslim world. For this he was awarded the King's Award for Media Personality of the Year 2015.

Publications
Contemporary Thought in the Muslim World: Trends, Themes, and Issues (Routledge, 2019)
The Fatwa As an Islamic Legal Instrument: Concept, Historical Role, Contemporary Relevance (Gerlach Press, 2018)
The Poesis of Peace: Narratives, Cultures and Philosophies (Routledge, 2017), with Klaus-Gerd Giesen and Lenart Skof
A History of Islam in Indonesia: Unity in Diversity (Edinburgh University Press, 2017). Indonesian translation: Mengislamkan Indonesia: Sejarah Peradaban Islam di Nusantara (Penerbit Baca, 2018)
 Islam in Indonesia: The Contest for Society, Ideas and Values (Hurst and Oxford University Press, 2015). Indonesian Translation: Berebut Wacana: Pergulatan Wacana Umat Islam Indonesia Era Reformasi (Mizan, 2018).
 The Caliphate and Islamic Statehood (Gerlach Press, 2015)
Alternative Islamic Discourses and Religious Authority (Routledge, 2013), with Susanne Olsson
 Demystifying the Caliphate (Hurst and Oxford University Press, 2013), with Madawi al-Rasheed and Marat Shterin
 Cosmopolitans and Heretics (Hurst and Oxford University Press, 2011)
 Dr Muller's Asian-Journey: Thailand, Cambodia, Vietnam and Yunnan (White Lotus Press 2004)
 Strange Events in the Kingdoms of Cambodia and Laos(White Lotus Press, 2003)

Kersten also has contributed dozens of chapters, articles and reviews to edited volumes and academic journals. In addition, he writes a blog on alternative Islamic discourses under the title Critical Muslims, and used to contribute book and music reviews for the 'Rambles.net' website.

External links

 Staff page Faculty of Theology & Religious Studies, Catholic University Leuven
 Carool Kersten @ academia.edu
 Author page at Amazon
 Critical Muslims Blog

Videos (online interviews, talks and lectures

References

1964 births
Living people
Dutch historians of religion
Dutch Arabists
People from Leudal